The Second Javier Fernández government was the regional government of Asturias led by President Javier Fernández. It was formed in July 2015 after the regional election.

Investiture

Council of Government

References

2015 establishments in Asturias
Cabinets established in 2015
Cabinets disestablished in 2019
Cabinets of Asturias